The Alpina B4 and Alpina D4 are high-performance compact executive cars manufactured by the German automobile manufacturer, Alpina. Based on the BMW 4 Series, the B4 and D4 are manufactured in coupé and convertible body styles. The first generation B4 and D4 were launched in 2014 and the more powerful B4 S was launched in 2017.

Development and introduction 
Introduced at the 2013 Tokyo Motor Show, the B4 is based on the outgoing 435i. The N55 straight-six engine was modified by using twin-turbochargers, a 61 percent larger intercooler and a new crankshaft. The engine is mated to a ZF 8HP70 "Touch tronic" paddle shift automatic transmission, with no manual transmission options available. The transmission was modified to provide better shift timing. There were options for either a rear-wheel-drive or all-wheel-drive drivetrain. The car has three driving modes "Comfort", "Sport" and "Sport +", which depend on the tweaking of the power delivered by the engine and suspension system settings according to the driving conditions.

The suspension system is a carryover from the D3 but has a 40 percent higher work rate. The B4 has adjustable dampers that can be calibrated to provide a softer compression but firmer rebound. The suspension system also has new bushings and anti-rollbars.

The car has a Brembo braking system with  front and  rear brake discs working in conjunction with four piston callipers at the front and two piston callipers at the rear. The callipers are painted in a shade called Alpina blue. The car also features special 20-inch Alpina classic multi-spoke wheels and Michelin Pilot super sport tires developed specially for the car.

The car is identical to the 435i on the exterior but includes Alpina badging, front and rear lip spoilers and a new rear bumper. The B4 has an Akrapovič stainless steel exhaust system with quad exhaust pipes. The B4 comes in four different colours: Classic Alpina Blue, Classic Alpina Green, Sapphire Black and Mineral White with optional Alpina pinstripes, it is also available in any of the colours offered by BMW Individual.

The interior has Lavalina leather upholstery, which can be tailored to customer specifications, and sports adjustable seats, a hand-stitched steering wheel and new door sills. The car retains the iDrive system from the donor car but has new Alpina gauges and Alpina badging on the steering wheel, headrests and floor mats.

Performance 

Variants

D4 

The D4 is the diesel variant of the B4. Based on the 435d, the N57 turbo diesel inline-6 engine found in the donor car was slightly modified by adding two small variable geometry turbochargers and a new intercooler. The engine is mounted to the same 8-speed automatic transmission as utilized in the B4. The D4 like the B4 is available in coupé and convertible body styles, with the convertible weighing  more than the coupé. The D4 is equipped with an Akrapovič stainless steel exhaust system with quad exhaust pipes. On the interior, burled Elm wood trim, adjustable heated front seats, dual zone climate control and Dakota leather trim are standard equipment. A heads-up display and an array of choices for the upholstery and trim are optional. The car also comes with automatic headlights and wipers. 20-inch multi-spoke alloy wheels and Alpina pinstriping on the exterior are also optional.

B4 S 
Introduced in 2017, the B4 S is a high performance variant of the B4, with further upgrades to the engine including 10 percent larger turbochargers, 20 percent larger intercoolers and an upgraded engine management system with 35 percent more capacity. The car features the same 8-speed automatic transmission as the standard B4. The suspension setup is relatively the same as the B4 but has new springs, dampers and toe-in tuning. The exhaust system is the same stainless steel Akrapovič unit as featured on the B4.

The B4 S features a new chin spoiler, a roof spoiler, Alpina pinstripes on the exterior as standard and the choice of Classic Alpina Blue, Sapphire Black, Mineral White and Classic Alpina Green exterior colors along with 20-inch classic Alpina multi-spoke alloy wheels with Michelin Pilot Sport 4S tyres.

On the interior, the B4 S features Dakota leather upholstery and BMW Professional infotainment system as standard having Merino leather upholstery as an option. The interior has Alpina badging and emblems throughout along with Alpina gauges.

The B4 S is lighter than the standard B4 and weighs .

B4 S Edition 99 

Introduced in October 2018, the B4 S Edition 99 is a limited edition of the B4 S limited to 99 units. The convertible accelerates to the same speed in 4.3 seconds.

Two new color options are available for the exterior, those being Fire Orange and Grigio Medio with black accents. A matte wrap is available as an option. The car is available with 20-inch classic Alpina multi-spoke alloy wheels in Ferric Gray finish.

The Edition 99 has a stiffer suspension system than the B4 S called the Alpina Sports Suspension Plus along with modified adjustable dampers. A limited slip differential and a torque vectoring system is available as an option.

The interior features piano black lacquer trim with "Edition" lettering, new sports seats, the shift paddles finished in matte black and a stainless steel plaque signifying the production number of the car out of the 99 units produced.

References

B4
Cars introduced in 2014
Cars introduced in 2017
Cars introduced in 2018
Rear-wheel-drive vehicles
Coupés
Convertibles
Compact executive cars
All-wheel-drive vehicles